Blackmoor Gate, the western gateway to Exmoor National Park, sits on the watershed between tributaries of the rivers Yeo and Heddon nearly 305 m (1000 ft) above sea level. It has long been a crossing of tracks — an ancient ridgeway following the former moorland ridge from the heights of Exmoor down to the sea at Mortehoe. The road from Lynton to Barnstaple crosses here at a low point of the ridge, as did the former Lynton & Barnstaple Railway. The former station is now 'The Old Station Inn' — a licensed restaurant.

Until the middle of the 19th century, open moorland ran to the east of the road between here and Parracombe with a gate onto the moor at this point. The name does not come from that of the Blackmore family - who owned the Manor of Court, Parracombe Churchtown. The land at Blackmoor Gate was owned by the Nott Pyke-Nott family and was part of the Manor of Rowley.

External links 

 Exmoor National Park Authority
 Exmoor Tourist Association

Villages in Devon
Exmoor